Selenophoma linicola is a fungal plant pathogen infecting flax.

References

External links 
 Index Fungorum
 USDA ARS Fungal Database

Fungal plant pathogens and diseases
Fiber plant diseases
Mycosphaerellaceae
Fungi described in 1947